The 14115/14116 Dr. Ambedkar Nagar–Prayagraj Express is an express train belonging to North Central Railway zone that runs between  and  in India. It is currently being operated with 14115/14116 train numbers on Daily basis.

In 2020, Western Railway Zone of Indian Railways extended the services of express train running between Indore to Khajuraho, to Prayagraj and Dr. Ambedkar Nagar.

Coach composition

The train has LHB rakes with max speed of 110 kmph. The train consists of 20 coaches :

 2 AC II Tier
 3 AC III Tier
 9 Sleeper coaches
 4 General Unreserved
 2 Seating cum Luggage Rake

Service

14115/ Dr. Ambedkar Nagar–Prayagraj Express has an average speed of 51 km/hr and covers 948 km in 18 hrs 45 mins.

The 14116/ Prayagraj–Dr. Ambedkar Nagar Express has an average speed of 51 km/hr and covers 948 km in 18 hrs 25 mins.

Route and halts 

The important halts of the train are:

 
 
 
 
 
 
 
 
 
 
 
 
 
 
 
 
 Shankargarh

Schedule

Traction

Both trains are hauled by a Diesel Loco Shed, Abu Road-based WDM-3A diesel locomotive.

Notes

References 

Transport in Mhow
Express trains in India
Rail transport in Madhya Pradesh
Rail transport in Uttar Pradesh
Railway services introduced in 2019